The Kreutzer Sonata is a 2008 film directed by Bernard Rose based on the 1889 novella by Leo Tolstoy. starring Danny Huston, Elisabeth Röhm, Matthew Yang King and Anjelica Huston.

It is Rose's second collaboration with Danny Huston (after Ivans XTC) and his third adaptation of a work by Tolstoy, following 1997's Anna Karenina and 2003's Ivans XTC.

"The Kreutzer Sonata" is the name commonly given to Ludwig van Beethoven's Violin Sonata no. 9 in A major. Director Bernard Rose had previously directed Immortal Beloved, a film about the life of Beethoven, in which there is a major (and pivotal) scene that features a performance of Beethoven's Kreutzer Sonata.

References

External links

2008 films
Films based on The Kreutzer Sonata
Films directed by Bernard Rose (director)
2000s erotic drama films
British erotic drama films
Films with screenplays by Bernard Rose (director)
2008 drama films
2000s English-language films
2000s British films